Mal/2 is an album by American jazz pianist Mal Waldron released on the Prestige label in November 1957. The CD reissue added two additional recordings from the same sessions originally released on The Dealers (1957) as bonus tracks.

Reception
The Allmusic review by Stephen Cook awarded the album 4 stars stating "Waldron here leads a potent crew on an engaging and original set of arrangements. A cut above many of the relatively straightforward and blues-based hard bop dates of the time".

Track listing
All compositions by Mal Waldron except as indicated
 "From This Moment On" (Cole Porter) – 6:15
 "J.M.'s Dream Doll" – 8:39
 "The Way You Look Tonight" (Dorothy Fields, Jerome Kern) – 8:25
 "One By One" – 9:41
 "Don't Explain" (Arthur Herzog Jr., Billie Holiday) – 6:58
 "Potpourri" – 6:36

CD reissue
"Blue Calypso" – 8:58 Bonus track on CD reissue
 "Falling in Love with Love" (Lorenz Hart, Richard Rodgers) – 11:39 Bonus track on CD reissue
Recorded at Rudy Van Gelder Studio in Hackensack, New Jersey on April 19 (tracks 2, 5, 6, 7, 8) and May 17 (tracks 1, 3, 4), 1957.

Personnel
 Mal Waldron — piano
 John Coltrane — tenor saxophone
 Idrees Sulieman (tracks 1, 3, 4), Bill Hardman (tracks 2, 5, 6, 7, 8) — trumpet
 Sahib Shihab — alto saxophone and baritone saxophone (tracks 1, 3, 4)
 Jackie McLean — alto saxophone (tracks 2, 5, 6, 7, 8)
 Julian Euell — bass
 Ed Thigpen (tracks 1, 3, 4), Art Taylor (tracks 2, 5, 6, 7, 8) — drums

References

Prestige Records albums
Mal Waldron albums
1957 albums
Albums recorded at Van Gelder Studio